The Tavé des Chasseurs (3,165 m) is a mountain of the Swiss Pennine Alps, located south of Fionnay in the canton of Valais. It belongs to the Grand Combin massif and lies east of the Corbassière Glacier.

References

External links
 Tavé des Chasseurs on Hikr

Mountains of the Alps
Alpine three-thousanders
Mountains of Switzerland
Mountains of Valais